Tyutchevskaya is a station on the Troitskaya line of the Moscow Metro which is currently under construction. It will open in 2024.

Name 
Initial name of the station was Slavyansky Mir ( "Slavic World") after a market located on the projected location of the construction works. On 15 November 2020, the head of Mosrentgen municipality O. A. Mitrofanov confirmed the new name for the station Tyutchevskaya. It is associated with the former Troitskoye estate which was located nearby and was owned by the well-known 19th century Russian poet Fyodor Tyutchev.

Gallery

References 

Moscow Metro stations
Troitskaya line